Chit Chit (born 18 October 1996) is a Burmese footballer who plays as a defender for the Myanmar women's national team.

International goals

See also
List of Myanmar women's international footballers

References

1996 births
Living people
Women's association football defenders
Burmese women's footballers
People from Kachin State
Myanmar women's international footballers